The black-throated green warbler (Setophaga virens) is a small songbird of the New World warbler family.

Description
It has an olive-green crown, a yellow face with olive markings, a thin pointed bill, white wing bars, an olive-green back and pale underparts with black streaks on the flanks. Adult males have a black throat and upper breast; females have a pale throat and black markings on their breast.

Measurements:

 Length: 
 Weight: 
 Wingspan:

Habitat and distribution
The breeding habitat of the black-throated green warbler is coniferous and mixed forests in eastern North America and western Canada and cypress swamps on the southern Atlantic coast. These birds' nests are open cups, which are usually situated close to the trunk of a tree.

These birds migrate to Mexico, Central America, the West Indies and southern Florida. One destination is to the Petenes mangroves of the Yucatán. Some birds straggle as far as South America, with the southernmost couple of records coming from Ecuador.

Behavior

Black-throated green warblers forage actively in vegetation, and they sometimes hover (gleaning), or catch insects in flight (hawking). Insects are the main constituents of these birds' diets, although berries will occasionally be consumed.

The call is a sharp .

This bird is vulnerable to nest parasitism by the brown-headed cowbird.

References

External links 

 Black-throated green warbler - Dendroica virens - USGS Patuxent Bird Identification InfoCenter
 Black-throated green warbler species account - Cornell Lab of Ornithology
 
 

black-throated green warbler
Birds of Canada
Birds of Saint Pierre and Miquelon
Birds of the Dominican Republic
Native birds of the Northeastern United States
Birds of Appalachia (United States)
Migratory birds (Western Hemisphere)
black-throated green warbler
Taxa named by Johann Friedrich Gmelin